Ponoarele is a commune located in Mehedinți County, Oltenia, Romania. It is composed of fifteen villages: Băluța, Bârâiacu, Brânzeni, Buicani, Ceptureni, Cracu Muntelui, Delureni, Gărdăneasa, Gheorghești, Ludu, Ponoarele, Proitești, Răiculești, Șipotu and Valea Ursului.

The commune has many natural monuments, including Podul lui Dumnezeu (God's Bridge), Peștera Bulba (Bulba Cave), Câmpul de Lapiezuri, Lacul Zaton (Zaton Lake), Peștera Ponoarele (Ponoarele Cave), Valea Morilor (Valley of the Mills) and Pădurea de liliac (Lilac forest).

Local holidays 
 Sărbătoarea liliacului Ponoarele
 Festivalul național „Ponoare, Ponoare”

External links 
Ponoarele village tourist guide

References

Communes in Mehedinți County
Localities in Oltenia